Brian Patrick Monahan (born 1960) is the Attending Physician of the United States Congress and the United States Supreme Court and holds the rank of rear admiral in the United States Navy. Monahan was selected by the leadership of the Congress and nominated to the position and rank by United States President Barack Obama in January 2009. He previously served as the director of hematology and medical oncology at the National Naval Medical Center. He is a Master of The American College of Physicians and a Member of the Academy of Medicine.

Monahan is an experienced internal medicine and hematology and medical oncology (HMO) doctor and researcher, from 1987-1989 Monahan served as the battalion surgeon for the 3rd Battalion 6th Marine Regiment of the 2nd Marine Division prior to his training in internal medicine at the National Naval Medical Center. In the early 1990s, Monahan was a staff physician for the Office of Attending Physician and maintained a supporting role with the office during countless National Special Security Events, State of the Union Addresses and Joint Sessions of Congress, and essential continuity of government initiatives. He served as professor and chairman of medicine at The Uniformed Services University of the Health Sciences in Bethesda, Maryland, prior to his present assignment. He returned permanently in the spring of 2008 as the assistant attending physician.

In May 2003, Monahan was presented with the 18th Annual Clinical Investigation Program Award for his project entitled, A Pilot Study of Oxaliplatin and Capecitibine in Adult Patients with Refractory Solid Tumors. The three-year project tested the effectiveness of an anti-cancer drug on 100 patients with colon cancer. Working with the National Cancer Institute Monahan served as the principal investigator on countless clinical trials of novel anti-cancer drugs and assisted heavily in the discovery of the unexpected sudden death associated with the first non-sedating antihistamines like Seldane. Monahan was also Navy specialty leader for hematology and medical oncology from 2001-2008, chairman of the U. S. Military Cancer Institute Medical Oncology Program and associate director for federal compliance and human subjects protections from 2002-2008. His expertise and work with the American Society of Clinical Oncology was instrumental in the creation of the first national in-training competency examination in medical oncology in 2008.

Monahan is also a medical educator at the Uniformed Services University (USU) Department of Medicine where he has been selected Outstanding Teacher of the Year multiple times.  He became assistant professor of medicine at USU in 1991 and was promoted to associate professor in 1999 and professor of medicine and pathology in 2006. He was named the Outstanding Teacher of the Year of The National Cancer Institute in 2000.

Education
Monahan received his B.S. summa cum laude from Fairfield University and M.D. magna cum laude from the Georgetown University School of Medicine.  He trained in internal medicine and later hematology and medical oncology (HMO) at National Naval Medical Center (NNMC). He is certified by the American Board of Internal Medicine in internal medicine, hematology and medical oncology.

References

External links
Official US Navy Biography *

1960 births
Living people
Employees of the United States Congress
Fairfield University alumni
Georgetown University School of Medicine alumni
Medical educators
Uniformed Services University of the Health Sciences faculty
People from Fairfield, Connecticut
United States Navy Medical Corps officers
United States Navy admirals
21st-century American politicians
Members of the National Academy of Medicine
American oncologists
American hematologists